David Martin Darst, CFA, is an American financier, educator, author, and triathlete.  For 17 years, he was a Managing Director and Chief Investment Strategist of Morgan Stanley Wealth Management, where he served as Vice Chairman of the Morgan Stanley Wealth Management Global Investment Committee. He was the founding President of the Morgan Stanley Investment Group, and the founding Chairman of the Morgan Stanley Asset Allocation Committee. Since 2014, he has served as an independent Senior Advisor to and a member of the Morgan Stanley Wealth Management Global Investment Committee.

Early life
Darst was born in Knoxville, Tennessee, the third of five sons born to Guy Bewley Darst and Susan Mary McGinnis Darst. Darst attended Father Ryan High School in Nashville, TN and earned a high school diploma from Phillips Exeter Academy, a BA degree in Economics from Yale University, and an MBA from Harvard Business School.

Lecturing and professional associations
Darst has lectured at Wharton, Columbia University, INSEAD, New York University, Washington State University, and Rice University business schools, and for nine years, Darst served as a visiting faculty member at Yale College, Yale School of Management, and Harvard Business School. He serves on the Investment Committee of the Phi Beta Kappa Foundation, and is a CFA Charterholder and a member of the New York Society of Security Analysts and the CFA Institute. On November 3, 2011 at the Metropolitan Club in New York, Darst was inducted by Quinnipiac University into their Business Leaders Hall of Fame.

Media appearances and publications
Darst has been profiled and/or quoted by The New York Times, The Wall Street Journal, Financial Times, Barron's, Worth magazine, and the Yale Economic Review.
Darst has also been an occasional contributor of articles to Forbes.com.

Books
 The Complete Bond Book (McGraw-Hill )
 The Handbook of the Bond and Money Markets (McGraw-Hill )
 The Art of Asset Allocation (McGraw-Hill )
 The Art of Asset Allocation, Second Edition, (McGraw-Hill )
 Mastering the Art of Asset Allocation (McGraw-Hill )
 Benjamin Graham on Investing (McGraw-Hill )
 The Little Book that Saves Your Assets (John Wiley ; a bestseller in The New York Times and Business Week weekly rankings)
 The Little Book that STILL Saves Your Assets (John Wiley )
 Voyager 3: Fifty-four Phases of Feeling (Seapoint Books )
 Portfolio Investment Opportunities in Managed Futures (John Wiley )
 Portfolio Investment Opportunities in China (John Wiley )
 Portfolio Investment Opportunities in Precious Metals (John Wiley )
 Portfolio Investment Opportunities in India (John Wiley )
 Flim-Flam Flora (Seapoint Books )

His books have been translated into Chinese, Japanese, Russian, German, Romanian, Korean, Indonesian, Italian, Norwegian, and Vietnamese.

References 

1947 births
Living people
People from Nashville, Tennessee
Phillips Exeter Academy alumni
Yale College alumni
Harvard Business School alumni
American financial analysts
CFA charterholders
Quinnipiac University people
Directors of Morgan Stanley